The 2001 Italian motorcycle Grand Prix was the fifth round of the 2001 Grand Prix motorcycle racing season. It took place on the weekend of 1–3 June 2001 at the Mugello Circuit.

500 cc classification
The race was held in two parts as rain caused its interruption; aggregate times from the two heats determined the final result.

250 cc classification

125 cc classification

Championship standings after the race (500cc)

Below are the standings for the top five riders and constructors after round five has concluded.

Riders' Championship standings

Constructors' Championship standings

 Note: Only the top five positions are included for both sets of standings.

References

Italian motorcycle Grand Prix
Italian
Motorcycle Grand Prix